Tabuan-Lasa, officially the Municipality of Tabuan-Lasa (Tausūg: Lupah Tabuan-Lasa; Chavacano: Municipalidad de Tabuan-Lasa), is a  municipality in the province of Basilan, Philippines. According to the 2020 census, it has a population of 29,327 people.

Tabuan-Lasa was created out of the 12 barangays of Sumisip that were not on Basilan Island, through Muslim Mindanao Autonomy Act No. 187, which was subsequently ratified in a plebiscite held on March 29, 2008.

Geography

Barangays
Tabuan-Lasa is politically subdivided into 12 barangays.

Climate

Demographics

In the 2020 census, Tabuan-Lasa had a population of 29,327.

Economy

References

External links
Tabuan-Lasa Profile at the DTI Cities and Municipalities Competitive Index
[ Philippine Standard Geographic Code]

Municipalities of Basilan
Island municipalities in the Philippines